Curio radicans, syn. Senecio radicans, is a succulent houseplant that is native to South Africa. A member of the family Asteraceae, the asters, this species is closely related to the common string of pearls and Curio hallianus. It has multiple tendrils of glossy, banana-shaped foliage. It is commonly known as string of bananas or fishhook senecio.

Like most members of the Curio genus, C. radicans is relatively hardy and easy to grow, making it a great starting point for novice gardeners and those seeking entry to the succulent or container gardening hobbies.  An interesting addition to any home or garden, C. radicans is especially good for pots, hanging baskets, succulent gardens, and other areas in need of textural interest.

Distribution
Curio radicans is native to the Cape Province region of South Africa.
In fact, in the desert areas of South Africa where aridity increases, including the Karroid central region, the dominant vegetation consists of xerophytic dwarf shrubs and succulents, including many members of the tribe Senecioneae. In these areas of very low moisture, the grasslands typical of other areas of Africa give way to areas in which grass is subdominant to these drought-tolerant plants, which are frequently spaced far apart with wide expanses of sandy or rocky stretches in between.

Habitat and ecology

As a native to the Cape Province area of South Africa, Curio radicans is a succulent that can grow in warm, tropical areas and also fares well in arid regions. Its succulent tissues help to conserve moisture, rendering it well-adapted for the dry, hot conditions characteristic of many parts of its native South Africa.
Like most succulents, this species is frost-tender and cannot withstand freezing temperatures (below 32 degrees F), restricting it to areas where the annual temperatures do not drop below this point.

Morphology

Individuals of this species have a prostrate growth habit with mat-forming stems 15–30 cm long. Its growth in long, matted tendrils makes the "string of bananas" an excellent groundcover, as well as ideal for cascading over the edges of containers or hanging baskets.

Foliage

Grown for the shape, texture, and color of its attractive foliage rather than for its blooms, Curio radicans can provide a textural element to a garden. This plant features fleshy, glossy, and elongated succulent leaves that curve and taper to a pointed tip, much like the shape of a banana. Each leaf is cylindrical in shape, 2–3 cm long, and features 2 translucent lines on either side. With an alternate arrangement of leaves and a delicate branching pattern of the strands, this plant's foliage is truly its most captivating feature.

Flowers and fruit
Curio radicans produces small, cinnamon-scented, white or off-white flowers, usually in the late winter or early spring seasons, although some growers are able to encourage multiple flowering periods throughout the year. Like other species in the genus Curio, the inflorescences consist of clusters of many small flowers on a common receptacle. This species is grown more for the color, shape, or texture of their foliage than for their blooms, which are small, white, and not very showy.

Availability
Available at many garden centers, specialty stores, and other places where plants are sold. Greenhouses specializing in unusual or specialty items are more likely to have this succulent house plant, but they are also sold through the internet.

References

External links
 Kew Plant List
 IPNI Listing

radicans
Flora of South Africa
Garden plants
Garden plants of Southern Africa
Drought-tolerant plants